The 2006 División Profesional season was the 72nd season of professional football in Paraguay.

Torneo Apertura

Standings

Torneo Clausura

Standings

Championship game playoff
The national championship game was played between the Apertura and Clausura tournaments winners.

Libertad declared as national champions by aggregate score of 2–1.

Aggregate table

Relegation / Promotion
 Fernando de la Mora automatically relegated to the second division after finishing last in the aggregate points table.
 Sol de América and Sportivo Trinidense promoted to the first division by finishing first and second respectively in the second division tournament.

Qualification to international competitions
Libertad qualified to the 2007 Copa Libertadores by winning the Torneo Apertura and the 2007 Copa Sudamericana by winning the national championship.
Cerro Porteño qualified to the Copa Libertadores 2007 by winning the Torneo Clausura
Tacuary qualified to the 2007 Copa Libertadores as the best finisher in the aggregate points table and the 2007 Copa Sudamericana by winning the Copa Sudamericana Qualifiers (see below).

Copa Sudamericana Qualifiers
Semifinals

Note: Tacuary advanced to the final due to better position in the aggregate points table.

Final

References
 Paraguay 2006 by Eli Schmerler and Juan Pablo Andrés at RSSSF
 Diario ABC Color

 
Para
Paraguayan Primera División seasons
1